AudioCodes Ltd. is a provider of advanced communications software, products and productivity solutions. Its services enable enterprises and service providers to build and operate all-IP voice networks for unified communications (UC), contact centers and hosted business services. Founded in 1993 by Shabtai Adlersberg and Leon Bialik, AudioCodes is listed on the NASDAQ stock exchange (NASDAQ: AUDC) and the Tel Aviv Stock Exchange.

AudioCodes' international headquarters and R&D facilities are located in Israel, with international branch offices.

More than 60 of the world's top 100 service providers use AudioCodes technology, including AT&T, Verizon, BT, DT and Telefónica.

Solutions
AudioCodes supplies suites of solutions for the enterprise and service provider markets. These include One Voice for Microsoft 365 to accelerate the voice-enablement of Microsoft Teams.

Products 
AudioCodes’ product portfolio includes:

 The Mediant family of multi-service business routers (MSBR).
 The 400HD series of IP phones.
 Management and monitoring software.
 Voca Call Automation.

Partnerships 
Most of AudioCodes’ sales are carried out through a global network of channel partners, resellers and system integrators. Today, AudioCodes' partner network consists of over 1000 resellers in more than 100 countries.

Acquisitions 

 2003 – Nortel Networks’ Universal Audio Server (UAS) product group
 2004 – Ai-Logix
 2006 – Nuera
 2006 – Netrake Corporation
 2007 – CTI Squared Ltd. ("CTI2")
 2010 – NSC
 2013 – MailVision
 2021  Callverso

See also
List of VoIP companies
VoIP, SIP, SIP trunking, voice gateways, SBC, MSBR, WebRTC, Microsoft Lync, white papers, Genesys, contact center, BroadSoft, management systems, service providers, broadband.

References

External links

Companies established in 1993
VoIP companies of Israel
Electronics companies of Israel
Telecommunications equipment vendors
Companies listed on the Nasdaq